The Hand & Flowers is a gastropub in Marlow, Buckinghamshire that opened in 2005. Owned and operated by Tom Kerridge and his wife Beth Cullen-Kerridge, it gained its first Michelin star within a year of opening and a second in the 2012 list, making it the first pub to hold two Michelin stars. It was named the AA Restaurant of the Year for 2011–12.

Description
The pub was purchased in 2005 by chef Tom Kerridge and his wife Beth, who ran the front of house. Located in Marlow, Buckinghamshire on West Street, only a few doors down from where Mary Shelley wrote Frankenstein. The pub gained its first Michelin star, and three AA rosettes in under a year.

At the AA Restaurant and Hotel Awards 2011–12 the pub was named the AA Restaurant of the Year for England. The Hand and Flowers was upgraded to two Michelin stars in the 2012 list, the first time a pub has ever held two stars. Michelin Guide editor Rebecca Burr said of The Hand & Flowers, "Tom’s cooking has risen to new heights. His dishes are sophisticated yet familiar and are a perfect match for the relaxed surroundings of his charming pub."

After Kerridge appeared on the BBC television show the Great British Menu, he added his two winning dishes to the menu at The Hand & Flowers. Another item on the menu is a hot chocolate tart with cacao from the estates of Willie Harcourt-Cooze. Vegetarian dishes are usually created ad hoc as required, and rely on the invention of the chefs.

The Hand & Flowers also has four suites for rent in two refurbished cottages. Each suite has a separate entrance, and the suites are each decorated around a different centerpiece such as a copper bath or private terrace and hot tub.

References

External links
 

2005 establishments in England
Gastropubs in England
Marlow, Buckinghamshire
Michelin Guide starred restaurants in the United Kingdom
Restaurants established in 2005
Restaurants in Buckinghamshire